Taşlıpınar is a village in the Doğanyurt District of Kastamonu Province in Turkey. Its population is 194 (2021).

References

Villages in Doğanyurt District